Chikurubi Prison is  a maximum security  prison in Zimbabwe. Located on the outskirts of the country's capital, Harare,  the prison is notorious for alleged mistreatment and human rights abuses. The prison is  known for its overcrowding and poor sanitary conditions. Cells typically measure 9 metres (30 ft) by 4 metres (13 ft), and there are as many as 25 prisoners housed in each cell.

Notable prisoners
Roy Bennett, Zimbabwean politician and former colonial policeman
Simon Mann, British mercenary and former British Army officer
Munyaradzi Kereke, former wealthy businessman, former ZANU–PF MP, and former advisor to retired Reserve Bank of Zimbabwe governor Gideon Gono, sentenced in 2016 to  10 years in jail after being convicted of raping his then 11-year-old niece, at the end of a decade-long legal campaign to bring him to justice despite him allegedly being protected by police and the Attorney General's office. Kereke has apologised to  "Gono and the government but not to his victims".
Former Army Captain Albert Matapo (who retired in 1991, 16 years before his alleged coup attempt), and six others, Emmanuel Marara, Oncemore Mudzurahona, Partson Mupfure, Nyasha Zivuku, Rangarirai Mazivofa and Shingirai Webster Mutemachani, ended up spending seven years in Chikurubi Prison for alleged involvement in the 2007 Zimbabwean alleged coup d'état attempt. They were accused of planning a coup d'état to replace Robert Mugabe by Emmerson Mnangagwa, but claim they were only trying to form a new political party, and deemed Mnangagwa as bad as Mugabe, and potentially even worse. No treason trial took place, for lack of evidence, and they were released on March 1, 2014, and subsequently launched their new political party. Matapo later described the prison as "hell".
Chidhumo and Masendeke, the only criminal duo who launched the only successful prison break of the Chikurubi Prison.
Hopewell Chin'ono, a journalist and frequent critic of the government.

References

External links
Zimbabwe Prisons at Tagzania.com

Prisons in Zimbabwe